Ulf Nils Johan Norberg (born 28 July 1941) is a retired Swedish ski jumper. He competed in the normal hill at the 1968 Winter Olympics and finished in 48th place.

References

1941 births
Living people
Swedish male ski jumpers
Ski jumpers at the 1968 Winter Olympics
Olympic ski jumpers of Sweden